Carpark North is a Danish electronic rock band. The band was formed in Aarhus, Denmark on 28 July 1999 by Lau Højen (vocal, guitar), Søren Balsner (bass, synthesisers) and Morten Thorhauge (drums). The name "Carpark North" was created from the electro and rock genres: "Carpark" stands for car parks, edges, roughness, metal – the rock part, and "North" stands for northern lights, stars ethereal electronics.

History
The foundation for Carpark North was laid at Mellerup Efterskole, where Søren Balsner and Lau Højen met and formed a band. This band played in the national championship in rock in 1997.

Søren and Lau split up after Mellerup, and Lau started his education at high school  – Aarhus Katedralskole. Here he joined a band – "Spacekraft" and met Morten Thorhauge a young drummer from Søften. After a couple of months Lau and Morten formed their own band, and contacted Søren.

The first notes by Carpark North were played on a hot summer day in July 1999 in the MGK-facilities in Aarhus, Denmark.

In January 2010, the band announced that they had been signed internationally by Sony Music.

In 2016, the band released "Unbreakable," the theme song for LEGO's Nexo Knights television series.

Members
Lau Højen – vocals, guitar
Søren Balsner – bass, synths, vocals
Morten Thorhauge – drums

Awards
 Danish Music Awards (2006) – Video of the Year ("Human"), directed by Martin de Thurah
 Robert (2004) – Best Film Score ("Transparent & Glasslike")
 Zulu Award (2003) – Newcomer of the Year
 P3 Guld (2003) – Hit of the Year ("Transparent & Glasslike")
 Gaffa Prisen (2003) – Newcomer of the Year
 P3 Prisen (2001) – Newcomer MP3 Prisen

Appearances in media
 TV show Alias (2005) – with the song "Homeland" from Carpark North.
 Video game FIFA 08 (2007) – with the song "Human" from All Things to All People.
 Film Midsommer (2003) – Carpark North's debut Carpark North was chosen to be the official soundtrack for the film.
 Film Nordkraft (2005)

Discography

Studio albums

Compilation albums

EPs
 Carstereo (2000) (demo)
 40 Days EP (2002)

Singles

Notes
  – "Transparent & Glasslike" didn't chart on the Danish Singles Chart until in 2009.

References

External links
 
 
 

Musical groups established in 1999
Danish rock music groups
Danish electronic rock musical groups
1999 establishments in Denmark